Margarita Pracatan (born Margarita Figueroa; 11 June 1931 – 23 June 2020) was a Cuban-born novelty singer, who became well-known in the 1990s when she performed regularly on Clive James' TV show in Britain.

Biography
Margarita Figueroa was born in Santiago, Cuba. Her father was a union leader. She began to sing at home when she was three years old.  Her family fled to the U.S. after the Cuban revolution. She worked in a store selling men's underwear while singing at night.

She found success in the 1990s when she was booked on numerous occasions to appear on Clive James's television show in the UK, adopting the surname "Pracatan". James showed clips of her heavily Hispanic-inflected performances of pop hits (including Lionel Richie's "Hello" and "New York, New York") on his BBC series Saturday Night Clive.  According to her website, Clive James discovered her on Manhattan public-access television cable TV program in 1994 and invited her to the UK to appear on his show. He sweet-talked her into believing he was serious, and she signed up. Although he never mocked her openly, his introductions to her end-of-show performances contained teasing irony. James once said of Pracatan, "She never lets the words or melody get in her way. She is us, without the fear of failure."

Pracatan toured regularly in the United Kingdom and Australia, also appearing as part of the Sydney Gay and Lesbian Mardi Gras festival during the mid-1990s.   Pracatan appeared in an episode of Real Housewives of New York City in 2019, performing a cover version of Luann de Lesseps’s “Money Can’t Buy You Class”.  Radio DJ Martin Kelner also played her frequently on his BBC Night Network and BBC Radio 2 programmes.

Pracatan died in New York in June 2020, aged 89. She was divorced with one daughter.

Discography

References

External links
 
 Margarita Pracatan on the IMDb

1931 births
2020 deaths
20th-century Cuban women singers
Outsider musicians
Cuban expatriates in the United States